The 2017–18 Golden State Warriors season was the 72nd season of the franchise in the National Basketball Association (NBA), and its 56th in the San Francisco Bay Area. The Warriors entered the season as the defending NBA champions and repeated, beating the Cleveland Cavaliers 4–0 in the Finals. It was the first time in NBA history and in North America's four major professional sports leagues that two teams had met to compete for a Championship for a fourth consecutive year. It was the Warriors' third championship in four years, and sixth overall. Golden State won the Pacific Division title and Western Conference Championship for the fourth consecutive season. In the playoffs, the Warriors defeated the San Antonio Spurs in the First Round 4–1 and the New Orleans Pelicans 4–1 in the Semi-finals. They beat the top-seeded Houston Rockets 4–3 in the Western Conference Finals.

Golden State set the NBA record of 16 consecutive home wins in the playoffs, surpassing the 1990–91 Chicago Bulls. Stephen Curry set the NBA record for three-pointers made in an NBA Finals game with nine. Stephen Curry, Kevin Durant, Draymond Green, and Klay Thompson were all named to the All-Star Game, the first time in NBA history that a team has had four All-Stars in consecutive seasons, and just the ninth time in NBA history a single team has had four players in the game. Curry was named captain, being the leading vote getter from the Western Conference. The Warriors ended the regular season with a slew of injuries to all four of their All-Stars, including an MCL sprain for Curry that kept him out for six weeks, and lost ten of their last seventeen games. For the first time since the 2013–14 season, they did not clinch first place for home-court advantage for the playoffs and failed to win 60 games for the first time under Steve Kerr. This season marked David West's final season in the NBA. He retired on August 30, 2018, having won two NBA championships with the Warriors.

Draft picks

The 2017 NBA draft was held on June 22, 2017, at the Barclays Center in Brooklyn. The Warriors didn't have a pick, but acquired the Chicago Bulls 38th pick in the second round for cash. They chose power forward Jordan Bell out of Oregon. After the draft, the team signed Bell's former Oregon teammate, Chris Boucher, to a two-way contract.

Preseason
On July 1, 2017, Stephen Curry agreed to re-sign with Golden State on a super-max five-year/$201m deal. The Warriors also resigned Kevin Durant, and their veteran core of Shaun Livingston, David West, Andre Iguodala, Zaza Pachulia and JaVale McGee. Golden State also added Nick Young and Omri Casspi on one-year deals.

Records

NBA records

Individual
 Most three-pointers made in a Finals game: 9 (Stephen Curry, Game 2 of 2018 NBA Finals)
 Most consecutive playoff games with a made three-pointer: 90 - ongoing streak (Stephen Curry, has made a three-pointer in every playoff game he's played in)
 Most three-pointers made in a four-game Finals series: 22 (Stephen Curry, previous record was 11 (jointly held by Robert Horry and Penny Hardaway)
 Most consecutive playoff games with a made three-pointer at home: 46 - ongoing streak (Stephen Curry)
 Most consecutive playoff games with a made three-pointer on the road: 44 - ongoing streak (Stephen Curry)
 Most three-pointers made in a quarter in the Finals game: 5 (Stephen Curry, Game 2 of 2018 NBA Finals. Tied with Kenny Smith.)
 Most points scored by a player in a Western Conference Finals series: 213 (Kevin Durant, previous record of 212 points jointly held by Hakeem Olajuwon (1995) and Shaquille O'Neal (2002))
 10 or more three-pointers made in a game: 9 times (Stephen Curry). Klay Thompson (4 times) and J. R. Smith (3 times) are the only other players in NBA history with more than one game with ten made threes.

Team
 Largest average point differential in a Finals series: +15.00 PPG (vs Cavs)
 Highest postseason winning percentage over a four-year-span: 63–20 (.795) from 2015 to 2018, the Chicago Bulls are second with 51–17 (.750) from 1991-94.
 Most consecutive playoff home wins: 16 (surpassing the 1990–91 Chicago Bulls record of 15. The Warriors record dates back to 2017, where they went 9–0 at home)
 Most consecutive playoff series with a road win: 19 (tied with the Miami Heat)
 Half-time comebacks: First team in NBA history to come back from 20+ point deficits at half-time twice in the same season (22 against the Philadelphia 76ers and 20 against the New Orleans Pelicans)
 Largest comeback by a road team at halftime in a Game 7 in the playoffs: 11 points down (vs. the Rockets, won 101–92)
 First team in NBA history to win multiple elimination games in the same series despite trailing by 10-or-more at halftime: Western Conference Finals vs Rockets
 Highest +/- scoring differential in the 3rd quarter during the playoffs: Outscored opponents in the 3rd quarter by 153 points

Franchise records

Individual
 Most triple-doubles in franchise history: 22 (Draymond Green, he broke Tom Gola's record of 20)
 Most three-pointers made in the playoffs: 378 (Stephen Curry, Ray Allen holds the NBA record with 385)
 First Warriors player to average a triple-double in a playoff series: Draymond Green (14.8 points, 11.8 rebounds and 10 assists) vs the Pelicans, only the 13th time in NBA history a player has averaged a triple double in a series
 Most triple-doubles in the post-season: 4 (Draymond Green, surpassed Tom Gola's record of 3)
 Most consecutive regular season games with a made three-pointer: 95 (Klay Thompson, third best in NBA history behind Stephen Curry (157) and Kyle Korver (127)
 Most playoff games played: 102 (Klay Thompson)

Team
 Most consecutive road wins: 14 (tied, also achieved in the 2015–16 season)
 Largest winning margin in the playoffs: 41 points (126–85, Game 3 against the Rockets)
 Fewest points allowed in a half in the playoffs: 25 points (Second half, Game 6 against the Rockets)
 Fewest points allowed in a quarter in the playoffs: 9 points (Fourth quarter, Game 6 against the Rockets)
 Most consecutive Western Conference Finals appearances: 4 (only the second team in NBA history to reach the Finals four times in a row. The Los Angeles Lakers appeared eight times in a row between 1982 and 1989)
 Road trip sweep: Six games (first Warriors team to sweep a six-game road trip, only the 11th team in NBA history to do so)
 Most points scored in the first half of a playoff game: 76 (against the Pelicans)
 Most consecutive trips to the NBA Finals: 4 (The Warriors are the fifth franchise in NBA history to reach the Finals in four-straight seasons, joining the Boston Celtics (10, 1957-1966; 4, 1984–87), Cleveland Cavaliers (4, 2015–18), Los Angeles Lakers (4, 1982-1985) and Miami Heat (4, 2011-2014))

Roster

Standings

Division

Conference

Game log

Preseason

|- style="background:#fbb;"
| 1
| September 30
| Denver
| 
| Stephen Curry (11)
| Draymond Green (8)
| Draymond Green (4)
| Oracle Arena19,596
| 0–1
|- style="background:#fbb"
| 2
| October 5
| Minnesota
| 
| Kevin Durant (20)
| Curry, Green, Pachulia (6)
| Draymond Green (8)
| Shenzhen Universiade Sports Centre17,495
| 0–2
|- style="background:#bfb"
| 3
| October 8
| @ Minnesota
| 
| Stephen Curry (40)
| Stephen Curry (6)
| Stephen Curry (8)
| Mercedes-Benz ArenaN/A
| 1–2
|- style="background:#bfb"
| 4
| October 13
| Sacramento
| 
| Stephen Curry (18)
| Jordan Bell (11)
| Klay Thompson (6)
| Oracle Arena19,596
| 2–2

Regular season

|- style="background:#fcc"
| 1
| October 17
| Houston
| 
| Nick Young (23)
| Draymond Green (11)
| Draymond Green (13)
| Oracle Arena19,596
| 0–1
|- style="background:#cfc"
| 2
| October 20
| @ New Orleans
| 
| Klay Thompson (33)
| Zaza Pachulia (9)
| Draymond Green (9)
| Smoothie King Center18,171
| 1–1
|- style="background:#fcc"
| 3
| October 21
| @ Memphis
| 
| Stephen Curry (37)
| Kevin Durant (13)
| Draymond Green (6)
| FedExForum17,794
| 1–2
|- style="background:#cfc"
| 4
| October 23
| @ Dallas
| 
| Stephen Curry (29)
| Kevin Durant (8)
| Curry, Green (8)
| American Airlines Center19,875
| 2–2
|- style="background:#cfc"
| 5
| October 25
| Toronto
| 
| Stephen Curry (30)
| Draymond Green (11)
| Draymond Green (6)
| Oracle Arena 19,596
| 3–2
|- style="background:#cfc"
| 6
| October 27
| Washington
| 
| Kevin Durant (31)
| Kevin Durant (11)
| Stephen Curry (8)
| Oracle Arena 19,596
| 4–2
|- style="background:#fcc"
| 7
| October 29
| Detroit
| 
| Klay Thompson (29)
| Draymond Green (13)
| Stephen Curry (8)
| Oracle Arena 19,596
| 4–3
|- style="background:#cfc"
| 8
| October 30
| @ L.A. Clippers
| 
| Stephen Curry (31)
| Draymond Green (9)
| Curry, Thompson, Green (6)
| Staples Center19,068
| 5–3

|- style="background:#cfc"
| 9
| November 2
| @ San Antonio
| 
| Klay Thompson (27)
| Curry, Durant (8)
| Draymond Green (6)
| AT&T Center 18,418
| 6–3
|- style="background:#cfc"
| 10
| November 4
| @ Denver
| 
| Kevin Durant (25)
| Omri Casspi (8)
| Stephen Curry (11)
| Pepsi Center  19,711
| 7–3
|- style="background:#cfc"
| 11
| November 6
| Miami
| 
| Kevin Durant (21)
| Draymond Green (9)
| Kevin Durant (6)
| Oracle Arena 19,596
| 8–3
|- style="background:#cfc"
| 12
| November 8
| Minnesota
| 
| Klay Thompson (28)
| Stephen Curry (8)
| Stephen Curry (8)
| Oracle Arena 19,596
| 9–3
|- style="background:#cfc"
| 13
| November 11
| Philadelphia
| 
| Kevin Durant (29)
| Draymond Green (10)
| Stephen Curry (9)
| Oracle Arena 19,596
| 10–3
|- style="background:#cfc"
| 14
| November 13
| Orlando
| 
| Kevin Durant (21)
| David West (11)
| Kevin Durant (8)
| Oracle Arena 19,596
| 11–3
|- style="background:#fcc"
| 15
| November 16
| @ Boston
| 
| Kevin Durant (24)
| Green, Casspi (8)
| Curry, Green (5)
| TD Garden 18,624
| 11–4
|- style="background:#cfc"
| 16
| November 18
| @ Philadelphia
| 
| Stephen Curry (35)
| Green, West (7)
| Draymond Green (8)
| Wells Fargo Center 20,848
| 12–4
|- style="background:#cfc"
| 17
| November 19
| @ Brooklyn
| 
| Stephen Curry (39)
| Stephen Curry (11)
| Draymond Green (8)
| Barclays Center17,732
| 13–4
|- style="background:#fcc"
| 18
| November 22
| @ Oklahoma City
| 
| Stephen Curry (24)
| Omri Casspi (6)
| Curry, Green (6)
| Chesapeake Energy Arena18,203
| 13–5
|- style="background:#cfc"
| 19
| November 24
| Chicago
| 
| Stephen Curry (33)
| Stephen Curry (7)
| Zaza Pachulia (6)
| Oracle Arena19,596
| 14–5
|- style="background:#cfc"
| 20
| November 25
| New Orleans
| 
| Stephen Curry (27)
| Draymond Green (7)
| Draymond Green (8)
| Oracle Arena19,596
| 15–5
|- style="background:#fcc"
| 21
| November 27
| Sacramento
| 
| Klay Thompson (21)
| David West (7)
| Draymond Green (8)
| Oracle Arena19,596
| 15–6
|- style="background:#cfc"
| 22
| November 29
| @ L.A. Lakers
| 
| Kevin Durant (29)
| Draymond Green (11)
| Draymond Green (9)
| Staples Center18,997
| 16–6

|- style="background:#cfc"
| 23
| December 1
| @ Orlando
| 
| Klay Thompson (27)
| Zaza Pachulia (8)
| Curry, Green (10)
| Amway Center18,846
| 17–6
|- style="background:#cfc"
| 24
| December 3
| @ Miami
| 
| Stephen Curry (30)
| Draymond Green (7)
| Draymond Green (9)
| American Airlines Arena19,600
| 18–6
|- style="background:#cfc"
| 25
| December 4
| @ New Orleans
| 
| Stephen Curry (31)
| Draymond Green (9)
| Stephen Curry (11)
| Smoothie King Center17,004
| 19–6
|- style="background:#cfc"
| 26
| December 6
| @ Charlotte
| 
| Kevin Durant (35)
| Kevin Durant (11)
| Kevin Durant (10)
| Spectrum Center19,334
| 20–6
|- style="background:#cfc"
| 27
| December 8
| @ Detroit
| 
| Kevin Durant (36)
| Kevin Durant (10)
| Draymond Green (13)
| Little Caesars Arena20,491
| 21–6
|- style="background:#cfc"
| 28
| December 11
| Portland
| 
| Kevin Durant (28)
| Casspi, Durant (9)
| Durant, Iguodala (5)
| Oracle Arena19,596
| 22–6
|- style="background:#cfc"
| 29
| December 14
| Dallas
| 
| Kevin Durant (36)
| Casspi, Durant (11)
| Andre Iguodala (10)
| Oracle Arena19,596
| 23–6
|- style="background:#cfc"
| 30
| December 18
| @ L.A. Lakers
| 
| Kevin Durant (36)
| Kevin Durant (11)
| Kevin Durant (8)
| Staples Center18,997
| 24–6
|- style="background:#cfc"
| 31
| December 20
| Memphis
| 
| Klay Thompson (29)
| Durant, McCaw (8)
| Bell, Thompson (5)
| Oracle Arena19,596
| 25–6
|- style="background:#cfc"
| 32
| December 22
| L.A. Lakers
| 
| Kevin Durant (33)
| Draymond Green (11)
| Durant, Green (7)
| Oracle Arena19,596
| 26–6
|- style="background:#fcc"
| 33
| December 23
| Denver
| 
| Kevin Durant (18)
| Jordan Bell (10)
| Andre Iguodala (7)
| Oracle Arena19,596
| 26–7
|- style="background:#cfc;"
| 34
| December 25
| Cleveland
| 
| Kevin Durant (25)
| Draymond Green (12)
| Draymond Green (11)
| Oracle Arena19,596
| 27–7
|- style="background:#cfc;"
| 35
| December 27
| Utah
| 
| Kevin Durant (21)
| Jordan Bell (13)
| Draymond Green (8)
| Oracle Arena19,596
| 28–7
|- style="background:#fcc;"
| 36
| December 29
| Charlotte
| 
| Kevin Durant (27)
| Draymond Green (11)
| Draymond Green (16)
| Oracle Arena19,596
| 28–8
|- style="background:#cfc;"
| 37
| December 30
| Memphis
| 
| Stephen Curry (38)
| David West (11)
| Kevin Durant (9)
| Oracle Arena19,596
| 29–8

|- style="background:#cfc;"
| 38
| January 3
| @ Dallas
| 
| Stephen Curry (32)
| Kevin Durant (12)
| Stephen Curry (8)
| American Airlines Center20,212
| 30–8
|- style="background:#cfc;"
| 39
| January 4
| @ Houston
| 
| Stephen Curry (29)
| Draymond Green (14)
| Draymond Green (10)
| Toyota Center18,055
| 31–8
|- style="background:#cfc;"
| 40
| January 6
| @ L.A. Clippers
| 
| Stephen Curry (45)
| Draymond Green (12)
| Green, Iguodala (7)
| Staples Center19,068
| 32–8
|- style="background:#cfc;"
| 41
| January 8
| Denver
| 
| Stephen Curry (32)
| Jordan Bell (8)
| Draymond Green (10)
| Oracle Arena19,596
| 33–8
|- style="background:#fcc;"
| 42
| January 10
| L.A. Clippers
| 
| Kevin Durant (40)
| Draymond Green (10)
| Durant, Green, Livingston (4)
| Oracle Arena19,596
| 33–9
|- style="background:#cfc;"
| 43
| January 12
| @ Milwaukee
| 
| Kevin Durant (26)
| Draymond Green (10)
| Draymond Green (7)
| Bradley Center18,717
| 34–9
|- style="background:#cfc;"
| 44
| January 13
| @ Toronto
| 
| Klay Thompson (26)
| Curry, Durant (6)
| Stephen Curry (9)
| Air Canada Centre20,078
| 35–9
|- style="background:#cfc;"
| 45
| January 15
| @ Cleveland
| 
| Kevin Durant (32)
| Draymond Green (16)
| Draymond Green (9)
| Quicken Loans Arena20,562
| 36–9
|- style="background:#cfc;"
| 46
| January 17
| @ Chicago
| 
| Klay Thompson (38)
| Zaza Pachulia (11)
| Kevin Durant (7)
| United Center21,372
| 37–9
|- style="background:#fcc;"
| 47
| January 20
| @ Houston
| 
| Kevin Durant (26)
| Durant, Green (7)
| Stephen Curry (8)
| Toyota Center18,055
| 37–10
|- style="background:#cfc
| 48
| January 23
| New York
| 
| Stephen Curry (32)
| Kevin Durant (14)
| Stephen Curry (6)
| Oracle Arena19,596
| 38–10
|- style="background:#cfc;"
| 49
| January 25
| Minnesota
| 
| Kevin Durant (28)
| Kevin Durant (10)
| Kevin Durant (11)
| Oracle Arena19,596
| 39–10
|- style="background:#cfc;"
| 50
| January 27
| Boston
| 
| Stephen Curry (49)
| Draymond Green (11)
| Curry, Green (5)
| Oracle Arena19,596
| 40–10
|- style="background:#fcc;"
| 51
| January 30
| @ Utah
| 
|Stephen Curry (26)
|Kevin Durant (11)
|Draymond Green (8)
| Vivint Smart Home Arena19,911
| 40–11

|- style="background:#cfc;"
| 52
| February 2
| @ Sacramento
| 
| Kevin Durant (33)
| Zaza Pachulia (13)
| Curry, Durant, Green (6)
| Golden 1 Center16,583
| 41–11
|- style="background:#fcc;"
| 53
| February 3
| @ Denver
| 
| Kevin Durant (31)
| Zaza Pachulia (8)
| Draymond Green (8)
| Pepsi Center20,103
| 41–12
|- style="background:#fcc;"
| 54
| February 6
| Oklahoma City
| 
| Kevin Durant (33)
| Draymond Green (8)
| Draymond Green (7)
| Oracle Arena19,596
| 41–13
|- style="background:#cfc;"
| 55
| February 8
| Dallas
| 
| Kevin Durant (24)
| Draymond Green (10)
| Stephen Curry (8)
| Oracle Arena19,596
| 42–13
|- style="background:#cfc;"
| 56
| February 10
| San Antonio
| 
| Klay Thompson (25)
| Draymond Green (8)
| Draymond Green (11)
| Oracle Arena19,596
| 43–13
|- style="background:#cfc;"
| 57
| February 12
| Phoenix
| 
| Stephen Curry (22)
| Omri Casspi (10)
| Stephen Curry (7)
| Oracle Arena19,596
| 44–13
|- style="background:#fcc;"
| 58
| February 14
| @ Portland
| 
| Kevin Durant (50)
| Draymond Green (12)
| Draymond Green (7)
| Moda Center19,520
| 44–14
|- style="text-align:center;"
| colspan="9" style="background:#bbcaff;"|All-Star Break
|- style="background:#cfc;
| 59
| February 22
| L.A. Clippers
| 
| Stephen Curry (44)
| Draymond Green (8)
| Stephen Curry (10)
| Oracle Arena19,596
| 45–14
|- style="background:#cfc;"
| 60
| February 24
| Oklahoma City
| 
| Kevin Durant (28)
| Stephen Curry (9)
| Draymond Green (8)
| Oracle Arena19,596
| 46–14
|- style="background:#cfc;"
| 61
| February 26
| @ New York
| 
| Klay Thompson (26)
| Kevin Durant (9)
| Draymond Green (6)
| Madison Square Garden19,812
| 47–14
|- style="background:#cfc;"
| 62
| February 28
| @ Washington
| 
| Kevin Durant (32)
| Andre Iguodala (7)
| Draymond Green (11)
| Capital One Arena20,356
| 48–14

|- style="background:#cfc;"
| 63
| March 2
| @ Atlanta
| 
| Curry, Durant (28)
| Draymond Green (7)
| Draymond Green (9)
| Philips Arena16,728
| 49–14
|- style="background:#cfc;"
| 64
| March 6
| Brooklyn
| 
| Stephen Curry (34)
| Curry, Durant, Iguodala (6)
| Draymond Green (9)
| Oracle Arena19,596
| 50–14
|- style="background:#cfc;"
| 65
| March 8
| San Antonio
| 
| Kevin Durant (37)
| Draymond Green (12)
| Draymond Green (10)
| Oracle Arena19,596
| 51–14
|- style="background:#fcc;"
| 66
| March 9
| @ Portland
| 
| Kevin Durant (40)
| Draymond Green (12)
| Durant, Green (6)
| Moda Center19,487
| 51–15
|- style="background:#fcc;"
| 67
| March 11
| @ Minnesota
| 
| Kevin Durant (39)
| Kevin Durant (12)
| Draymond Green (7)
| Target Center18,978
| 51–16
|- style="background:#cfc;"
| 68
| March 14
| LA Lakers
| 
| Kevin Durant (26)
| Zaza Pachulia (12)
| Kevin Durant (6)
| Oracle Arena19,596
| 52–16
|- style="background:#fcc;"
| 69
| March 16
| Sacramento
| 
| Quinn Cook (25)
| Draymond Green (10)
| Draymond Green (7)
| Oracle Arena19,596
| 52–17
|- style="background:#cfc;"
| 70
| March 17
| @ Phoenix
| 
| Quinn Cook (28)
| Draymond Green (11)
| Draymond Green (8)
| Talking Stick Resort Arena18,055
| 53–17
|- style="background:#fcc;"
| 71
| March 19
| @ San Antonio
| 
| Quinn Cook (20)
| Kevon Looney (8)
| Quinn Cook (5)
| AT&T Center18,418
| 53–18
|- style="background:#cfc;"
| 72
| March 23
| Atlanta
| 
| Stephen Curry (29)
| Zaza Pachulia (9)
| Cook, Iguodala (6)
| Oracle Arena19,596
| 54–18
|- style="background:#fcc;"
| 73
| March 25
| Utah
| 
| Quinn Cook (17)
| JaVale McGee (9)
| Quinn Cook (8)
| Oracle Arena19,596
| 54–19
|- style="background:#fcc;"
| 74
| March 27
| Indiana
| 
| Nick Young (12)
| Kevon Looney (11)
| Quinn Cook (7)
| Oracle Arena19,596
| 54–20
|- style="background:#fcc;"
| 75
| March 29
| Milwaukee
| 
| Quinn Cook (30)
| Green, Iguodala (5)
| Durant, Green (6)
| Oracle Arena19,596
| 54–21
|- style="background:#cfc;"
| 76
| March 31
| @ Sacramento
| 
| Kevin Durant (27)
| Kevin Durant (10)
| Draymond Green (7)
| Golden 1 Center17,583
| 55–21

|- style="background:#cfc;"
| 77
| April 1
| Phoenix
| 
| Kevin Durant (29)
| Kevin Durant (11)
| Draymond Green (12)
| Oracle Arena19,596
| 56–21
|- style="background:#cfc;"
| 78
| April 3
| @ Oklahoma City
| 
| Kevin Durant (34)
| Kevin Durant (10)
| Draymond Green (8)
| Chesapeake Energy Arena18,203
| 57–21
|- style="background:#fcc;"
| 79
| April 5
| @ Indiana
| 
| Kevin Durant (27)
| Klay Thompson (7)
| Kevin Durant (7)
| Bankers Life Fieldhouse17,923
| 57–22
|- style="background:#fcc;"
| 80
| April 7
| New Orleans
| 
| Kevin Durant (41)
| Durant, Green (10)
| Draymond Green (9)
| Oracle Arena19,596
| 57–23
|- style="background:#cfc;"
| 81
| April 8
| @ Phoenix
| 
| Klay Thompson (34)
| Cook, Green, Looney (6)
| Kevin Durant (9)
| Talking Stick Resort Arena18,055
| 58–23
|- style="background:#fcc;"
| 82
| April 10
| @ Utah
| 
| Klay Thompson (23)
| Zaza Pachulia (6)
| Shaun Livingston (4)
| Vivint Smart Home Arena18,306
| 58–24

Playoffs

|- style="background:#cfc;"
| 1
| April 14
| San Antonio
| 
| Klay Thompson (27)
| Durant, Green (8)
| Draymond Green (11)
| Oracle Arena19,596
| 1–0
|- style="background:#cfc;"
| 2
| April 16
| San Antonio
| 
| Kevin Durant (32)
| Iguodala, McGee (7)
| Durant, Green (6)
| Oracle Arena19,596
| 2–0
|- style="background:#cfc;"
| 3
| April 19
| @ San Antonio
| 
| Kevin Durant (26)
| Kevin Durant (9)
| Draymond Green (7)
| AT&T Center18,418
| 3–0
|- style="background:#fcc;"
| 4
| April 22
| @ San Antonio
| 
| Kevin Durant (34)
| Draymond Green (18)
| Draymond Green (9)
| AT&T Center18,418
| 3–1
|- style="background:#cfc;"
| 5
| April 24
| San Antonio
| 
| Kevin Durant (25)
| Draymond Green (19)
| Draymond Green (7)
| Oracle Arena19,596
| 4–1

|- style="background:#cfc;"
| 1
| April 28
| New Orleans
| 
| Klay Thompson (27)
| Draymond Green (15)
| Draymond Green (11)
| Oracle Arena19,596
| 1–0
|- style="background:#cfc;"
| 2
| May 1
| New Orleans
| 
| Kevin Durant (29)
| Draymond Green (9)
| Draymond Green (12)
| Oracle Arena19,596
| 2–0
|- style="background:#fcc;"
| 3
| May 4
| @ New Orleans
| 
| Klay Thompson (26)
| Draymond Green (12)
| Draymond Green (9)
| Smoothie King Center18,551
| 2–1
|- style="background:#cfc;"
| 4
| May 6
| @ New Orleans
| 
| Kevin Durant (38)
| Durant, Green (9)
| Draymond Green (9)
| Smoothie King Center18,513
| 3–1
|- style="background:#cfc;"
| 5
| May 8
| New Orleans
| 
| Stephen Curry (28)
| Draymond Green (14)
| Draymond Green (9)
| Oracle Arena19,596
| 4–1

|- style="background:#cfc;"
| 1
| May 14
| @ Houston
| 
| Kevin Durant (37)
| Draymond Green (9)
| Draymond Green (9)
| Toyota Center18,055
| 1–0
|- style="background:#fcc;"
| 2
| May 16
| @ Houston
| 
| Kevin Durant (38)
| Stephen Curry (7)
| Stephen Curry (7)
| Toyota Center18,119
| 1–1
|- style="background:#cfc;"
| 3
| May 20
| Houston
| 
| Stephen Curry (35)
| Draymond Green (17)
| Durant, Green (6)
| Oracle Arena19,596
| 2–1
|- style="background:#fcc;"
| 4
| May 22
| Houston
| 
| Stephen Curry (28)
| Draymond Green (14)
| Draymond Green (8)
| Oracle Arena19,596
| 2–2
|- style="background:#fcc;"
| 5
| May 24
| @ Houston
| 
| Kevin Durant (29)
| Draymond Green (15)
| Stephen Curry (6)
| Toyota Center18,208
| 2–3
|- style="background:#cfc;"
| 6
| May 26
| Houston
| 
| Klay Thompson (35)
| Draymond Green (10)
| Draymond Green (9)
| Oracle Arena19,596
| 3–3
|- style="background:#cfc;"
| 7
| May 28
| @ Houston
| 
| Kevin Durant (34)
| Draymond Green (13)
| Stephen Curry (10)
| Toyota Center18,055
| 4–3

|- style="background:#cfc;"
| 1
| May 31
| Cleveland
| 
| Stephen Curry (29)
| Draymond Green (11)
| Curry, Green (9)
| Oracle Arena19,596
| 1–0
|- style="background:#cfc;"
| 2
| June 3
| Cleveland
| 
| Stephen Curry (33)
| Kevin Durant (9)
| Stephen Curry (8)
| Oracle Arena19,596
| 2–0
|- style="background:#cfc;"
| 3
| June 6
| @ Cleveland
| 
| Kevin Durant (43)
| Kevin Durant (13)
| Draymond Green (9)
| Quicken Loans Arena20,562
| 3–0
|- style="background:#cfc;"
| 4
| June 8
| @ Cleveland
| 
| Stephen Curry (37)
| Kevin Durant (12)
| Kevin Durant (10)
| Quicken Loans Arena20,562
| 4–0
|- style="background:#;"

Player statistics

Regular season

|
| 51 || 51 || 32.0 || .495 || .423 || .921 || 5.1 || 6.1 || 1.6 || .2 || 26.4
|-
|
| 68 || 68 || 34.2 || .516 || .419 || .889 || 6.8 || 5.4 || .7 || 1.8|| 26.4
|-
|
| 73 || 73 || 34.3 || .488 || .440 || .837 || 3.8 || 2.5 || .8 || .5 || 20.0
|-
|
| 70 || 70 || 32.7 || .454 || .301 || .775 || 7.6 || 7.3 || 1.4 || 1.3 || 11.0
|-
|
| 80 || 8 || 17.4 || .412 || .377 || .862 || 1.6 || .5 || .5 || .1 || 7.3
|-
|
| 73 || 0 || 13.7 || .571 || .375 || .759 || 3.3 || 1.9 || .6 || 1.0 || 6.8
|-
|
| 64 || 7 || 25.3 || .463 || .282 || .632 || 3.8 || 3.3 || .8 || .6 || 6.0
|-
|
| 71 || 7 || 15.9 || .501 || .000 || .820 || 1.8 || 2.0 || .5 || .3 || 5.5
|-
|
| 69 || 57 || 14.1 || .564 || .000 || .806 || 4.7 || 1.6 || .6 || .2 || 5.4
|-
|
| 65 || 17 || 9.5 || .621 || .000 || .731 || 2.6 || .5 || .3 || .9 || 4.8
|-
|
| 57 || 13 || 14.2 || .627 || .000 || .682 || 3.6 || 1.8 || .6 || 1.0 || 4.6
|-
|
| 57 || 10 || 16.9 || .409 || .238 || .765 || 1.4 || 1.4 || .8 || .2 || 4.0
|-
|
| 66 || 4 || 13.8 || .580 || .200 || .545 || 3.3 || .6 || .5 || .8 || 4.0
|-
|
| 15 || 0 || 5.9 || .500 || – || .600 || .9 || .1 || .1 || .2 || 1.7
|-
|
| 1 || 0 || 1.0 || .000 || .000 || – || 1.0 || .0 || .0 || .0 || .0
|-
| ≠
| 33 || 18 || 22.4 || .484 || .442 || .880 || 2.5 || 2.7 || .4 || .0 || 9.5
|-
| ‡
| 53 || 7 || 14.0 || .580 || .455 || .725 || 3.8 || 1.0 || .3 || .4 || 5.7
|}
After all games.
‡ Waived during the season
† Traded during the season
≠ Acquired during the season

Playoffs

|
| 21 || 21 || 38.4 || .487 || .341 || .901 || 7.8 || 4.7 || .7 || 1.2 || 29.0
|-
|
| 15 || 14 || 37.0 || .451 || .395 || .957 || 6.1 || 5.4 || 1.7 || .7 || 25.5
|-
|
| 21 || 21 || 37.8 || .465 || .427 || .871 || 4.1 || 1.8 || .8 || .3 || 19.6
|-
|
| 21 || 21 || 39.0 || .432 || .266 || .796 || 10.6 || 8.1 || 2.0 || 1.5 || 10.8
|-
|
| 15 || 12 || 26.7 || .494 || .378 || .706 || 4.5 || 2.7 || 1.4 || .5 || 8.1
|-
|
| 21 || 0 || 17.2 || .536 || .000 || .880 || 2.2 || 1.5 || .3 || .0 || 6.7
|-
|
| 13 || 9 || 12.2 || .672 || .000 || .667 || 3.2 || .3 || .2 || .8 || 6.5
|-
|
| 17 || 0 || 10.3 || .448 || .226 || .824 || 1.4 || .6 || .2 || .1 || 4.8
|-
|
| 21 || 5 || 18.4 || .542 || .000 || .381 || 4.2 || .9 || .7 || .4 || 4.1
|-
|
| 18 || 0 || 9.7 || .600 || .500 || 1.000 || 2.1 || 1.8 || .3 || .6 || 3.3
|-
|
| 20 || 2 || 10.3 || .302|| .298 || .750 || .6 || .2 || .1 || .0 || 2.6
|-
|
| 17 || 0 || 10.2 || .531 || .000 || .500 || 2.8 || .9 || .4 || .5 || 2.4
|-
|
| 7 || 0 || 3.7 || .571 || – || .750 || 1.7 || .1 || .4 || .1 || 2.4
|-
|
| 4 || 0 || 2.8 || .500 || – || .667 || .8 || .0 || .0 || .0 || 1.0
|-
|
| 6 || 0 || 2.7 || .500 || .000 || 1.000 || .5 || .0 || .3 || .0 || .7
|}

Transactions

Trades

Free agency

Re-signed

Additions

Subtractions

Awards

References

Golden State Warriors seasons
Golden State Warriors
Golden State Warriors
Golden State Warriors
Western Conference (NBA) championship seasons
NBA championship seasons